Jošan or Jošani is a village in Krbava, Croatia. It is located on the D1 highway between Pećani and Udbina.

History
The 1712–14 census of Lika and Krbava registered 589 inhabitants, all of whom were Serbian Orthodox ("Vlach").

Population
According to the 2011 census, the total population of the settlement was 66, with majority of ethnic Serbs. The 1991 census registered 227 residents, 223 of whom were Serbs.

References

External links

Populated places in Lika-Senj County